Willis Avery (Woody) Wood (August 6, 1921 – January 17, 2021) was an American microbiology professor, an inventor, and an entrepreneur. He was the president of the American Society for Microbiology in 1980. He is known for his research on bacterial enzymes and the molecular biology of sugars and amino acids.

Biography
Wood graduated from high school in Binghamton, New York and graduated in 1947 with a B.S. in bacteriology from Cornell University. From 1943 to 1946 he served in the U.S. Army as a first lieutenant in the Quartermaster Corps. At Cornell University, Irwin Gunsalus was his faculty advisor. In 1947 Gunsalus moved to Indiana University Bloomington (IU) and Wood followed him to become a graduate student there. In 1950 Wood graduated from IU with a Ph.D. in microbiology. His Ph.D. thesis on the enzymology of Enterococcus faecalis was supervised by Gunsalus. Wood was from 1950 to 1958 a faculty member in the dairy science department of the University of Illinois Urbana-Champaign and from 1958 to 1982 a professor of biochemistry at Michigan State University (MSU) There he played an important role in the formation of the biochemistry department and chaired the department from 1964 to 1974. At MSU, many collaborators after years of research found that adenosine monophosphate (AMP) acts as an allosteric ligand promoting dimerization of the identical subunits of the coenzyme pyridoxal phosphate. Such dimerization greatly decreases the Michaelis constant KM in the Michaelis–Menten kinetics of the dehydratase for L-threonine. This finding was a first in the enzymology of ligand-induced oligomerization.

At Michigan State, Wood developed a recording spectrophotometer with a new photomultiplier arrangement and an automatic cuvette changer that was programmable. This automated system, manufactured by Gilford Instrument Laboratories, Inc., became widely used in research on enzymes. In 1981 Neogen Corporation was founded, with some investment from MSU, to promote biotechnology in Lansing and the rest of Michigan. Wood became Neogen's first president in 1982. From 1982 to 1990 he was the director of microbiology at the Salk Institute Biotechnology Industrial Associates (SIBIA) in La Jolla. Phillips Petroleum Company supported his research on oil recovery enhanced by bacteria. From 1990 to 2019 he was the principal scientist and vice-president of The Agouron Institute, with locations in both San Diego and Pasadena.

In 1955 he received the Eli Lilly and Company-Elanco Research Award.

In 1947 he married Alice Jane Spencer of Nimmonsburg, New York. She died in 1975. In 1976 he married Hazel Katherine (Reiten) LeGrand of Iron Mountain, Michigan. His second wife died in 2012. Upon his death he was survived by three children from his first marriage, four grandchildren, and four great-grandchildren.

Selected publications

References

1921 births
2021 deaths
American microbiologists
Cornell University alumni
Indiana University Bloomington alumni
University of Illinois Urbana-Champaign faculty
Michigan State University faculty
People from Binghamton, New York